Max Greger (April 2, 1926, Munich – August 15, 2015, Munich) was a German jazz musician, saxophonist, big band bandleader and conductor.  He recorded over 150 records  in jazz and pop music.

In 1948 he founded his first sextet with acclaimed musicians, including Hugo Strasser. In 1959 he was the first western orchestra  to tour the Soviet Union. In 1963 he put together a top orchestra for ZDF, which for years supported all major TV shows.

His son, Max Greger Jr. and grandson, Max Greger Jr.Jr. are accomplished musicians as well.

Selected albums
 European Jazz Sounds (1963), Brunswick Records 267 918, Polydor 829 257-2
 Yakety Sax (1964), Polydor 237 374
 Maximum (1965), Brunswick, Polydor 825 703-2
 Ball Paré (1965), Polydor 237 483
 Tanz mit mir (1965), Polydor 249 034
 Eine kleine Tanzmusik (1966), Polydor 249 066
 Greger in the Night (1966), Polydor 249 103
 Greger in Rio (196?), Polydor 249 112
 Live –  „Tour de dance“ with 28 Hits and Evergreens (196?), Polydor 249 273
 In the Mood for Dancing – 28 Glenn Miller Evergreens (1969), Polydor 249 315
 Sunshine Starshine (1969), Polydor 2371 009
 Gaudi in Bavaria (1970), Polydor 2371 046
 Max Greger plays Glenn Miller (1970), Polydor 2371 047
 Olympia-Dancing ’72 (1971), Polydor 2371 153
 Sax-Appeal (1971), Polydor 2371 197
 Trumpets Trumpets Trumpets (1971), Polydor 2371 198
 Hits marschieren auf – Folge 1 (1972), Polydor 2371 286
 Strictly for Dancing (1972), Polydor 2371 317
 Hits marschieren auf – Folge 2 (1973), Polydor 2371 379
 Tanz und trimm dich fit (1973), Polydor 2371 433
 Tanz ’74 (1973), Polydor 2371 434
 Hits marschieren auf – Folge 3 (1974), Polydor 2371 485
 Trimm und tanz dich top-fit (1974), Polydor 2371 513
 Tanz ’75 (1974), Polydor 2371 526
 Max, du hast das Tanzen raus (1975), Polydor 2371 570
 Soft-Ice Dancing (1975), Polydor 2371 589
 Top-fit in den Schnee (1975), Polydor 2371 607
 Tanz ’76 (1975), Polydor 2371 609
 Tanz mit mir – Folge 2 (1975), Polydor 2371 630
 Auf geht’s (1976), Polydor 2371 684
 Alles tanzt auf mein Kommando (1976), Polydor 2371 692
 Tanz mit mir – Folge 3 (1976), Polydor 2371 694
 Die Tanzplatte des Jahres ’77 (1976), Polydor 2371 720
 Die Tanzplatte des Jahres ’78 (1977), Polydor 2371 820
 Die Tanzplatte des Jahres ’79 (1978), Polydor 2371 921
 White Christmas (1979), Polydor Spectrum 551 299-2
 Tanz ist Trumpf – The Dancxe Party of the Year (1980), Polydor 2372 040
 Mach mal wieder Tanztag (1980; Sales: + 250,000; DE: gold disc), Polydor 2475 728
 Klassisches Tanzvergnügen (1984), Polydor 817 857-2
 Max Greger und sein Enzian-Sextett (1984), Polydor 821 650-2
 Supertanzmusik (1984), Polydor 823 687-2
 Traumzeit – Max Greger senior and junior and 100 enchanted violins  (1986), Polydor 831 476-2
 Oscar-Melodien zum Tanzen (1987), Polydor 833 009-2
 Lovebird – The Saxy Feeling-Sound (1988), Polydor 833 921-2
 Evergreens im  (1988), Polydor 835 916-2
 Tanzen ’89 – Today & Traditional (1988), Polydor 837 316-2
 Mambo-Jambo – Tanzen im Latin-Sound, 1989, Polydor 837 929-2
 Tanzen ’90 – Today & Traditional, 1989, Polydor 841 166-2
 Tanzen ’91 (1990), Polydor 843 932-2
 Zauber der Berge – Max Greger and his Golden Bavaria Orchestra (1990), Polydor 843 933-2
 Laßt uns tanzen – Die klassische Tanzplatte (1991), Polydor 849 021-2
 Tanzen ’92 (1991), Polydor 511 071-2
 Sax in Love (1992), Polydor 513 040-2
 Tanzen ’93 (1992), Polydor 513 992-2
 Eine Reise ins Glück – in Billy Vaughn Sound (1993), Polydor 519 911-2
 Tanzen ’94 (1993), Polydor 519 912-2
 together – Greger und Greger (1995), Polydor 529 156-2
 world wide hits – Greger and Greger (1996), Polydor 533 508-2
 Night Train – Swing & Jazz Forever (1999), Polydor 543 393-2
 Happy Birthday! Max Greger 1980ths – 40 Hits, 2-CD compilation with 11 new titles (2006), Koch Universal 06024 9876941
 Hallo, kleines Fräulein, Compilation 1958 - 1965, „Jazzclub“-Reihe (2007), Universal 06024 9845696
 Greger's Groove Party, Compilation  1965 - 1973, „Jazzclub“-Reihe (2008), Universal 06007 5307296

Recognition
 
1987: Officers Cross of the Order of Merit of the Federal Republic of Germany
2012: Bavarian Order of Merit
 There is a memorial plaque with his handprints and signature in Berlin-Mitte

References

External links

Max Greger at the Universal Music website

1926 births
2015 deaths
Officers Crosses of the Order of Merit of the Federal Republic of Germany
German jazz bandleaders
German jazz saxophonists
20th-century saxophonists